Principal Monuments of France is a series of four paintings created by Hubert Robert in 1786. They depict the ruins of several Roman structures in Provence.

Series
The paintings were made using oil on canvas. The subjects are ancient Roman ruins in Provence in southern France. The structures depicted are the interior of the Temple of Diana in Nîmes, the Triumphal Arch and Roman Theatre in Orange (combined in an imaginary perspective), the Maison Carrée, amphitheater and Tour Magne in Nîmes (also from an imaginary perspective), and the Pont du Gard over the Gardon river.

Background
Hubert Robert (1733–1808) belonged to a trend of 18th-century veduta painters specialized on ancient ruins, established in France through Giovanni Paolo Panini and Claude Joseph Vernet. This trend was greatly supported by the development of archeology, which increased the interest in ancient buildings. Robert had traveled in Italy in 1754–1765 and painted many Roman ruins on location. After returning to France he continued to paint ancient ruins as well as idealized versions of French landscapes.

History

The Principal Monuments of France was made in 1786 to decorate a room at the Palace of Fontainebleau, although the paintings were never installed at this location. In 1787 they were reproduced as engravings. The four paintings were also exhibited at the Salon in 1787. They were bought by the Bâtiments du Roi, but for unknown reasons two of them, The Arc and The Maison Carrée, were returned to the painter. On 13 July 1821 they were bequeathed by Robert's widow to the Louvre. All four paintings are now found in the Department of Paintings in the Louvre.

In 1789, Robert painted The Ruins of Nîmes, Orange and Saint-Rémy-de-Provence, which depicts all ruins seen in the Principal Monuments series.

See also
 Roman Gaul

References

External links
 The paintings in the Joconde database
 Intérieur du Temple de Diane à Nîmes
 L'Arc de triomphe et le Théâtre d'Orange
 La Maison Carrée, les Arènes et la Tour Magne à Nîmes
 Le Pont du Gard

1786 paintings
Architecture paintings
Landscape paintings
Painting series
Paintings in the Louvre by French artists
Paintings by Hubert Robert